Comarca de Baza is a comarca in the province of Granada, Spain. It contains the following municipalities:
 Baza
 Benamaurel
 Caniles
 Cortes de Baza
 Cuevas del Campo
 Cúllar
 Freila
 Zújar

References 

Comarcas of the Province of Granada